This is a list of Italian football transfers for co-ownership resolutions, for the 2009–10 season, from and to Serie A and Serie B.

References
General

Specific

Italy
Trans
2009